Tilak Kamod is a Hindustani classical raga.

Origin
The raga emerges from Khamaj thaat.

Technical description
The raga is of Shadava-Sampoorna nature, i.e., in its arohana (ascent) six notes are used (D is excluded), whereas the avarohana (descent) uses All seven notes.
All the swaras used in this raga are shuddha except for N which is sometimes komal (n). The usage of komal (n) brings in the characteristics of Khamaj thaat. However, shuddha N in the avarohana  is quite frequently used in north Indian style of performing this raga.

Arohana: 'Sa Re Ga Ma Pa Ni Sa' .

Avarohana: Sa' Pa Dha Ma Ga Sa Re Ga Sa 'Ni 'Pa 'Ni Sa Re Ga Sa .

Pakad:'Pa 'Ni Sa Re Ga Sa Re Pa Ma Ga Sa 'Ni

The vadi swar is Re, and the samvadi is Pa .

Samay (Time)
The raga is to be sung during the second quarter of the night (dwitiya prahar).

Further information
It is a very melodious raga, and whereas heavy classical genres like Khyals are often based on this raga, light classical genres are more popular in Tilak Kamod. Rarely, a tinge of Komal Ni is also used in this raga. The raga is very close to ragas like Desh, and hence requires a skilful rendition for the differences to be distinct to the listener.

External links
 
 SRA on Samay and Ragas
 Sarod performance by Arnab Chakrabarty

Hindustani ragas